Robinsons Dumaguete (formerly Robinsons Place Dumaguete) is a shopping mall located in Dumaguete, Philippines. It is the first and largest full-service shopping mall in Negros Oriental and is a major component of the Dumaguete Business Park and IT Plaza in Brgy. Calindagan. It features an activity center, two atria, and an al fresco dining area. The mall brings the outlet store brands such as Uniqlo, GUESS, Bench, Dumaguete famous Sans Rival shop, Hukad by Golden Cowrie, KFC, Shakey's Pizza Restaurant, and iStore among others.

Located in its vicinity is Go Hotels Dumaguete, a hotel chain also owned by Robinsons Land Corporation (RLC), and a public transport terminal which serves the commuting public coming from north and south of Dumaguete and the rest of Negros Oriental, as well as those from the neighboring provinces of Cebu, Siquijor, and some areas in Mindanao.

History

Robinsons Place Dumaguete opened on November 23, 2009, making it the 27th shopping mall development of Robinsons Malls, a division under Robinsons Land Corporation. It was constructed by Freyssinet Philippines, Inc. and is RLC's sixth mall development in the Visayas, and second in Negros Island after Robinsons Place Bacolod.

The mall has been awarded by the Philippine Retailers Association (PRA) as the Mall of the Year for 2012.

In October 2015, the Department of Foreign Affairs opened a passport office at the mall's second level. RPD launched the Lingkod Pinoy Center wherein some government agencies have put up offices inside the mall such as Professional Regulation Commission, SSS, Philhealth, LTO, PhilPost, Bureau of Quarantine and PSA.

The mall is currently undergoing major redevelopment and expansion.

See also 
 Robinsons Malls
 Dumaguete
 List of shopping malls in the Philippines

References

External links 

 Robinsons Place Dumaguete

Buildings and structures in Dumaguete
Shopping malls in the Philippines
Shopping malls established in 2009
Robinsons Malls